The Corps des ponts, des eaux et des forêts (in English "Corps of Bridges, Waters and Forests") is a technical Grand Corps of the French State (grand corps de l'Etat). Its members are senior officials, mainly employed by the French Ministry of Environment and Energy and by the Ministry of Agriculture. Most of them are from École polytechnique, where they are selected based on their ranking, and from AgroParisTech where they are selected based on an entrance exam, others are from École normale supérieure (Ulm) or the regular curriculum of the École des ponts ParisTech.

People entering the Corps (around 60 each year) are trained either at AgroParisTech, École des ponts ParisTech or abroad in specific fields, in particular when they are willing to pursue a PhD.

In 2002, the Corps des ponts et chaussées, and the different corps formed by the civil aviation engineers, the geography engineers and the meteorological engineers merged.

In 2009, the Corps des ponts et chaussées (in English "Corps of Bridges and Roads") and the Corps du génie rural, des eaux et des forêts (in English "Corps of Rural Engineering, Waters and Forests") merged into the current Corps des ponts, des eaux et des forêts.

Many executive positions in France's industries and administration are held by Corps des Ponts engineers. Being admitted to the Corps des Ponts program is still considered a significant fast-track for executive careers.

Important former or current members
 Paul-Louis Arslanian
 Henri Becquerel
 Christian Beullac
 Fulgence Bienvenüe
 Jean-Baptiste Biot
 Augustin-Louis Cauchy
 Gaspard-Gustave de Coriolis
 Henry Darcy
 Jules Dupuit
 Augustin-Jean Fresnel
 Freycinet
 Louis Joseph Gay-Lussac
 Pierre-Simon Girard
 Philippe LeBon
 Joseph Liouville
 Étienne-Louis Malus
 Pierre Méchain
 Charles Joseph Minard
 Claude-Louis Navier
 Jean Peyrelevade
 Gaspard de Prony
 Marie François Sadi Carnot (former president of the French Republic)
 Bernardin de Saint-Pierre
 Louis Vicat
 Jacques Villiers
 François Philippe Voisin
 Jean Tirole

References

Further reading
  Barrie M. Ratcliffe, "Bureaucracy and Early French Railroads: the Myth and the Reality." Journal of European Economic History 18#2 (1989): 331+.

External links
 Official Corps des ponts website—; Corps of Bridges, Waters and Forests.

.02
Bridges
Bridges in France
Forests of France
Water in France

Bridges